Rio was the brand name of a line of digital audio players and related audio products. It was a pioneer of the DAP ("MP3 player") industry when it released "Diamond Rio" player in 1998 that was the impetus for an infamous lawsuit. Various music players were released until Rio came to an end in 2005.

History

Rio was originally a brand of California based Diamond Multimedia. Rio Audio was best known for producing the Rio PMP300 model that was the impetus for a lawsuit in 1998 by the Recording Industry Association of America. That lawsuit eventually failed, leading the way for the portable digital music industry to take off.

Diamond Multimedia merged with S3 Graphics in 1999 - the resulting company was renamed SONICblue. Rio, Inc., a subsidiary of SONICblue, was formed in 2000. The company referred to itself as Rio Digital Audio - in later years this changed to simply Rio Audio. During this time, Rio's president was Jim Cady.

On March 21, 2003, SONICblue filed for Chapter 11 bankruptcy protection and then sold off its main product lines; Rio Audio was sold to Japanese firm D&M Holdings, which owned audio brands such as Denon, forming part of their Digital Networks North America subsidiary. Rio Audio was based in Santa Clara, California. Its president from that time until March 2004 was Jeffrey Hastings.

Like some other competitors in the digital audio player business, the Rio brand was unable to compete effectively against Apple's dominant iPod series of audio players. In August 2005, D&M Holdings announced the discontinuation of its production of audio players, after it had licensed its digital audio software technology to chipmaker SigmaTel the month before. The Rio brand and trademarked were retained by D&M Holdings.

Products

Rio USA
Portable digital audio players

Portable CD players
RioVolt SP50
RioVolt SP60
RioVolt SP65
RioVolt SP90
RioVolt SP100
RioVolt SP150
RioVolt SP250
RioVolt SP350

Home audio players
Rio HT-2030
Rio Central (aka HSX-109)
Rio EX-1000
Rio Receiver

Car audio players
Rio Car (aka Empeg Car)

Rio Japan

Rio DR30 (OEM BeatSounds EVR150)
Rio SU10 (OEM A-MAX Technology PA30A)
Rio SU30 (OEM i-BEAD i-BEAD100)
Rio SU35 (OEM AVC Technology Si-100)
Rio SU40 (OEM i-BEAD i-BEAD200)
Rio SU70 (OEM M-CODY MX-100)
Rio Unite 130 (OEM M-CODY MX-250)
Rio SU15-KJ (OEM AVC Technology)
Rio Si-200C (OEM AVC Technology)
Rio Si-300C (OEM AVC Technology)
Rio LIVE air
Rio LIVE mini
Rio LIVE gear (OEM Foster)

Rio OEM models
Nike PSA Play 60
Nike PSA Play 120
ESA S11
Motorola M25
Motorola M500
Dell Digital Audio Receiver

References

Digital audio players
Consumer electronics brands